David Riggs is the vice president of philanthropic strategy at Philanthropy Roundtable. He is the former vice president of the John William Pope Foundation.

Education
Riggs earned his bachelor's degree at the University of North Carolina at Wilmington. He received his PhD in economics at Clemson University.

Career
Riggs has worked as an environmental program officer at the Charles Koch Foundation. He has served as a senior fellow at the Capital Research Center, Competitive Enterprise Institute, and the Center of the American Experiment. He served as vice president of the John William Pope Foundation prior to joining Philanthropy Roundtable. He is a board member at the Martin Center.

References

University of North Carolina at Wilmington alumni
Clemson University alumni